Mister Monster may refer to:

 Doc Stearn...Mr. Monster, a comic-book character
 Mr. Monster, a novel by Dan Wells
 Mister Monster (band), an American horror punk band